The fourth siege of Krujë by the Ottoman Empire of Krujë in Albania occurred in 1478, ten years after the death of the Skanderbeg, and resulted in the town's capture after the failure of three prior sieges.

Demoralized and severely weakened by hunger and lack of supplies from the year-long siege, the defenders surrendered to Sultan Mehmed II, who had promised them they could leave unharmed in exchange.
One of the important historical sources about this siege is the fourth volume of the Annali Veneti e del Mondo manuscript written by Stefano Magno.

See also 
 Siege of Krujë (1450)
 Siege of Krujë (1466)
 Siege of Krujë (1467)
 Koca Davud Pasha

References 

Sir Edward Shepherd Creasy . History of the Ottoman Turks

Kruje
Kruje
Medieval Albania
Kruje
Conflicts in 1478
Battles of Mehmed the Conqueror
1478 in the Ottoman Empire
Ottoman Albania
Kruje